Sensory branding is a type of marketing that appeals to all the senses in relation to the brand. It uses the senses to relate with customers on an emotional level. It is believed that the difference between an ordinary product and a captivating product is emotion. When emotion flows in the marketplace, your product shines. When there is no emotion from the product, customers lack the enthusiasm and passion that launches a product to success. Brands can forge emotional associations in the customers' minds by appealing to their senses. A multi-sensory brand experience generates certain beliefs, feelings, thoughts and opinions to create a brandgon image in the consumer's mind.

Overview
Sensory branding is used to relate to the customer in a more personal way than mass marketing. It is a technique that does what traditional forms of advertising cannot. It is used in retail design, magazines, showrooms, trade-fair booths, service centers, and corporate headquarters. A multi-sensory experience occurs when the customer is appealed to by two or more senses.

According to Rieunier (2002), the sensory marketing approach tries to fill in the deficiencies of the "traditional marketing" which is too rational. Classic marketing is based on the idea that the customer is rational, that his behavioral is broke up in defined reasoned steps, according to the offer, the competition, the answer to his needs…By contrast, sensory marketing put the experiences lived by the consumers and his feelings in the process. These experiences have sensorial, emotional, cognitive, behavioral and relational dimensions, not only functional. It aims to create the adequacy of the products with their design and their packaging, and then to valorize them in a commercial environment to make them attractive. There, the consumer is behaving according to his impulsions and emotions, more than his reason.  According to Aradhna Krishna (2015), "in the past, communications with customers were essentially monologues—companies just talked at consumers. Then they evolved into dialogues, with customers providing feedback. Now they’re becoming multidimensional conversations, with products finding their own voices and consumers responding viscerally and subconsciously to them.” 

Aradhna Krishna (2011), has given a conceptual framework of Sensory Marketing, according to which the process of sensory marketing starts with the presence of stimuli in the shopping environment of the customer; this stimuli is then absorbed by the five sensations of the consumer which are Visual, Atmospheric, Tactile, Auditory and Gastronomic. The information received by the sensations are processed by the brain which helps to develop a perception in the customer mind, this perception can however result in emotional learning or cognition. Cognition refers to the mental process of learning and understanding through senses, experience and thought process. The emotional and cognition learning in turn affects the attitudes, learning, behavior, emotions and memory of the customer and alter the information stored in there.

Marketers mostly appeal to sight and sound. 99% of all brand communication focuses on sight and sound. However, in many instances, sound and smell are more effective than sight when branding a product or organization. Also, visual images are more distinctive when matched with a second sense.

The main use for sensory branding is to appeal to the consumer's senses. It is also used to understand the emotions and experiences of the consumer when being drawn to, purchasing or using the product, penetrate and dominate market share, increase profitability and to ensure initial and repeat purchases. Sensory branding is used to create an atmosphere that encourages the customer to pay money and can be influenced by sight, noise, touch, taste and smell.

Sensory marketing is defined as a way of: 
 measuring and explaining consumer emotions 
 spotting and capitalizing on new market opportunities 
 an opportunity to maximize product profitability 
 ensuring first and repeat purchase (loyalty) 
 ensuring long-lasting product success 

Sensory stimuli, in relation to retailing pertains to any event or object, igniting the senses, that elicits a response by the person receiving them. These faculties include; olfactory (smelling), tactile (touching), aural (hearing), visual (seeing) and oral (tasting). With the contemporary shopper being inspired by a unique range of experiential shopping environments, owners or designers are heavily concerned with market strategies driven to satisfy the consumers, or “sensation seekers”, desire, perception and satisfaction needs. According to Song (2010), customer's brand experience relates to what is memorable, with purchasing behavior driven by storytelling and emotion, thus sensory stimuli is used to create emotional ties, linking the consumer and the brand. When sensory orchestration is maximized a compelling experience is achieved with customers wanting to repeat through repeated visits.

Human experience is affected by cognitive processes, specifically thinking in conjunction with memory. The human sensory experience is not achieved by a single sensory input but by a “combination of perceptual systems overlapping one another”. It is in the interaction between information stimulating the present receptors and information from past experiences that already exist that the response is formed, therefore sensory stimuli have a direct influence on behaviors and attitudes of humans or consumers in retail environments (Song, 2010).

Sensory marketing is often intersecting with fields like social psychology and neurobiology. Theoretical explanations of the causes of sensory marketing are often connected to concepts like priming, crossmodal correspondences or sensation transference. Some allusions to evolutionary psychology are also often proposed.

The senses

Sight 
Sight has been the most used sense in the advertising world over the past century. Sight is the most prominent sense of all because eyes contain two-thirds of the sense cells in the body.  Firms or brands utilize this sense in order to establish its identity and ultimately create a sight experience for an individual. We use our sense of sight to perceive contrasts or differences between many things such as big or small, light or dark or thin and thick, this helps us realize when there are certain differences or changes in a new package, new store interior or new product design. We often notice these differences and acknowledge them, reactions to changes are prevalent in physical goods, services and the service landscape.

Design is one of the most important aspects of a product or service, it is through design that firms and brands can express personality which an individual identifies with. It has been said that design is the most potent expression of a brand's identity, especially when an individual's quest for personal quality of life and welfare is symbolized through different brands. Design can be used to convey if a certain brand is new and innovative such as Apple or old and retro such as the Volkswagen Beetle. Packaging is another important aspect that affects the sense of sight and tactics used to market this sense. Successful packages are those that can convey a combination of emotional and functional attributes such as numerous wine, spirits or beer bottles, which have a connecting story or myth. On a bottle of Mystery Cliffs, a French Chardonnay, a label from 1997 shows the high rocky coast of California with a lone pine standing out on a ledge. This way, the package portrays how exotic and exciting the wine is.

The sense of sight can also be used with a series of new and innovative technologies such as virtual reality. With the aid of these gadgets, firms and brands can provide customers with sensory experiences that are more immersive and would not be possible otherwise. Marriott Hotel's new 'Teleporter' is a great example: Where interested customers can use a pair of virtual reality glasses to see sights of potential travel destinations.

Sound 
Sound is a sense that is often underestimated in marketing, however, along with sight it accounts for 99% of all brand communication. Sound affects our mood and psychological state, promotes peace of mind and alerts us to danger. Since the early twentieth century, sound has been applied in mass marketing, to create awareness about a firm and its products mainly in television and radio. People often express their identity through sounds. Verbally, we convey to others who we are, where we come from, our likes and dislikes, how we feel, etc. Through the use of sound we can clarify our arguments, opinions and feelings in a manner that facial expressions alone cannot. We also use identify ourselves through the use of sounds, mainly music, which is why many brands and firms spend immense amounts of time and money to associate the right song or jingle with their product and build a stronger identity. U.S retail chains such as The Gap, Eddie Bauer and Toys "R" Us invest in music programs customized for them.

A very popular form of sound marketing is through the use of jingles. In the United States jingles were used as a new way to market new products and services as early as the 1920s. In 1938, Hereford-born Austen Croom-Johnson (1909–1964) and his Chicago-born lyricist partner, Alan Bradley Kent (né Karl Dewitt Byington, Jr.; 1912–1991) developed the jingle "Pepsi-Cola Hits the Spot," and in 1939 it debuted on radio and became known as the first network jingle. The Pepsi jingle was successfully placed in millions of jukeboxes around the United States. Jingles have traditionally been characterized by short lyrics and commercial messages. They are memorable because short sound sequences that are repeated tend to be easily remembered. Voices can also be used to create a connection between a brand and a sound. Voices are often perceived as personal, emotional and friendly which is why they are so effective for certain brands, however, a voice has to be used continuously and coherently in order to enhance the brand identity. BMW used David Suchet's voice for over 10 years to give the right feeling to its commercials.

Smell 
Of all five senses, smell is believed to be linked the most to emotion due to the brain's olfactory bulb, which detects odors, fast-tracks signals to the limbic system and then links emotion to memories. Recently, many companies have dedicated to sell scent and aromas to different brands and firms in order to enhance their marketing strategy and brand identity. There are about 20 scent-marketing companies in the world, collectively worth around $80 million, says Harald Vogt, co-founder of the Scent Marketing Institute in Scarsdale, New York. With the sense of smell being so sensitive and powerful it is not a surprise that many companies have joined the industry, after all, 75% of our emotions are generated by what we smell.

This form of sensory branding has already been used for some time, in fact, in 1990 Singapore airlines introduced Stefan Floridian Waters, a patented aroma that quickly became a unique trademark of Singapore Airlines. The distinctive aroma was blended into the flight attendants' perfume, into the hot towels served before take off and even made sure the whole plane had a hint of the smell. Travelers who took several flights on Singapore Airlines and were asked about the smell reported they instantly recognized it upon entering the aircraft, it is a smell that has the capabilities to jump-start a chain of emotions and comfortable memories, which is exactly what companies are looking for when entering this type of sensorial branding.

Taste 
The sense of taste is considered to be the most intimate one because we can't taste anything from a distance. It is also believed to be the most distinctly emotional sense. Our taste is also dependent on our saliva and differs on each different person. People who prefer saltier foods are used to a higher concentration of sodium and therefore have a saltier saliva. In fact, 78% of our taste preferences are dependent on one's genes. Taste also has a social aspect attached to it, we rarely seek to enjoy food by ourselves since eating usually facilitates social interaction between people. Business meetings and home dinners are almost all of the time in company of others and companies need to take this into consideration.

A Swedish company, City Gross, made great use of this when it opened it the spring of 2007. The Swedish food retail store delivered grocery bags to households containing bread, beverages, sandwich spread and fruits. Competition in the industry is known to be very high and most retailers used low prices or coupons to attract customers. City Gross managed to reach out to customers very differently from the traditional marketing which was very impersonal, the company delivered customers with a taste of the brand and customers perceived this as something more personal and intimate.

Touch 
Touch is central to human social life and is the most developed sensory modality at birth. In this case, it is very important in sensory branding because it strengthens the experience an individual has when interacting with a product. Tactile marketing can be used by brands to express their identity and values, however, this requires an interaction between consumer and brand and that is often hard from a distance. Tactile marketing can be facilitated by different sense expressions such as material and surface, temperature and weight and form and steadiness. Many people have a positive response to touch, which can be useful in services. The perception of touch, or haptics, is the only one that exists passively on all parts of our body. Unlike vision, which is perceived through the eyes, or hearing, which is perceived through the ears, haptic sensations are not limited to any one specific location. We have haptic receptors on all parts of the outside of our body and even in some internal locations, such as in our mouths. During a pleasant touching experience, the hormone oxytocin is released, which leads to calmness and well-being. Firms need to be very selective of when to utilize this since it is perceived diversely across different cultures.

History 
During the 1950s, marketers concentrated on using sight for branding. They focused on color and form to promote brands. This was because the main medium for advertising was posters. As television became popular, the consumers' sense of sound was appealed to in advertising. This was mainly during television commercials in the form of jingles.

In the 1970s marketers began to find that smell could be used in brand promotion. They were also able to adjust the scent of their products to make them more palatable for the consumer. Recently sensory branding has developed to encompass all five senses. This is because marketers now know that the more senses appealed to, the more effective the branding will be.

Cases of Sensory Marketing

Apple  
Apple has been providing consumers special experiences by stimulating human's senses, galvanizing the Apple brand, and intensifying communication with the consumers. The factors that stimulate senses are not only limited to Apple products, but throughout the concept store, that consumers can experience and learn more about the brand, Apple. Apple concept store is a place where consumers can 'experience' Apple. Consumers are able to see, touch, listen, and experience Apple comprehensively.  It was designed to maximize the sensuous value and contribute to creating an image of the Apple as 'state-of-the-art' lifestyle.

Starbucks 
Starbucks' philosophy is to give satisfaction to consumers not only in realms of taste, but also olfactory, visual, tactile, and auditory sense. In order to pursue such goals, Starbucks is making an effort to consistently create a sound, perfume, font, and taste that can appeal to consumers. All background music at Starbucks is selected and released from Hearmusic, from the main office of Starbucks. Hearmusic provides 2~3 CDs per month that contain approximately 100 songs to 9000 Starbucks shops worldwide.  From this, consumers were able to enjoy coffee at a refreshing and comfortable environment. Regardless of countries and culture, consumers are able to share in similar experiences at Starbucks.

Singapore Airlines 
Singapore Airlines is an example of a successful olfactory marketing company. Singapore Airlines introduced Stefan Floridian Waters, an aroma. An aroma which has been specifically designed as part of Singapore Airlines. Stefan Floridian Waters formed the scent in the flight attendants' perfume, was blended into the hot towels served before take off and generally permeated the entire fleet of Singapore Airlines planes. The patented aroma has since become a unique and very distinct trademark of Singapore Airlines.

Abercrombie & Fitch 
According to Khan (2014), the stores are intentionally designed from a multi-sensory point of view to get consumers to buy products:

Olfactory: Human beings can remember about 10,000 distinct odors that can trigger important memories that take us back to childhood. A study conducted by consumer psychologist Eric Spangenberg, found that Men do not like to spend lengthy periods of time in stores when it smells feminine, and equally the female counterpart when it smells masculine.  A & F, knowing who they want in store, spray doses of their men's fragrance “Fierce”, which they deem to be “packed with confidence and a bold masculine attitude” aligning with image of their intended demographic. Their brand image of a “classic, good looking and cool” teen is therefore associated with the fragrance and store, creating a “self-fulfilling prophecy for male clientele”, the notion that the receiving demographic can be like the A & F models and staff (Khan, 2014).

Visual: They market beautiful people, which albeit controversial, is scientifically viable as there is a symmetry and averageness of features that is associated with attractiveness is faces. Psychologist's referring to it as the “halo effect” with people automatically assigning good looking people with favorable attributes e.g. talent, kindness, intelligence. This creates a fondness and we have a tendency to comply more with the people we like. In associating these desired people with products A & F sell, they create an unknowing arousal and induce a pleasurable experience of the brand (Khan, 2014).

Aural: Music can help regulate emotions, affect moods, physical heart rate and increase physiological arousal. A & F know younger customers withstand louder club music, however older customers don’t, so in order to maintain their younger clientele they ensure their genre and volume is to the younger consumer's preference. As Emily Anthes of Psychology Today states, “Shoppers make more impulsive purchases when they're overstimulated. Loud volume leads to sensory overload, which weakens self-control” (Khan, 2014).

Garra rufa 
One particularly strange and exotic product that has come on the market is the fish pedicure service that has been popping up around the globe. In a service similar to a spa treatment, consumers pay in order to submerge their feet into a pond or a tub teeming with so-called doctor fish or Garra rufa . These fish are said to have therapeutic properties, eating away dead skin so that new, healthy skin can grow. While the sensation is very strange at first—and the thought of thousands of tiny fish nibbling away at one’s feet is eerie, to say the least—most people who try it find the experience soothing and rejuvenating after they get over their initial apprehensions.

See also
Sensory design

References

Sensory design
Types of branding